This is a list of the mammal species recorded in Western Sahara. Of the mammal species in Western Sahara, three are critically endangered, one is endangered, five are vulnerable, and one is near threatened. One of the species listed for Western Sahara can no longer be found in the wild.

The following tags are used to highlight each species' conservation status as assessed by the International Union for Conservation of Nature:

Order: Rodentia (rodents) 

Rodents make up the largest order of mammals, with over 40% of mammalian species. They have two incisors in the upper and lower jaw which grow continually and must be kept short by gnawing.

Suborder: Sciurognathi
Family: Sciuridae (squirrels)
Subfamily: Xerinae
Tribe: Xerini
Genus: Atlantoxerus
 Barbary ground squirrel, Atlantoxerus getulus LC
Family: Muridae (mice, rats, voles, gerbils, hamsters, etc.)
Subfamily: Deomyinae
Genus: Acomys
 Western Saharan spiny mouse, Acomys airensis LC
 Chudeau's spiny mouse, Acomys chudeaui LC
Subfamily: Gerbillinae
Genus: Dipodillus
 North African gerbil, Dipodillus campestris LC
Genus: Gerbillus
 Lesser Egyptian gerbil, Gerbillus gerbillus LC
 Pygmy gerbil, Gerbillus henleyi LC
Genus: Meriones
 Libyan jird, Meriones libycus LC
Genus: Pachyuromys
 Fat-tailed gerbil, Pachyuromys duprasi LC

Order: Lagomorpha (lagomorphs) 

The lagomorphs comprise two families, Leporidae (hares and rabbits), and Ochotonidae (pikas). Though they can resemble rodents, and were classified as a superfamily in that order until the early 20th century, they have since been considered a separate order. They differ from rodents in a number of physical characteristics, such as having four incisors in the upper jaw rather than two.
Family: Leporidae (rabbits, hares)
Genus: Lepus
Cape hare, L. capensis

Order: Erinaceomorpha (hedgehogs and gymnures) 

The order Erinaceomorpha contains a single family, Erinaceidae, which comprise the hedgehogs and gymnures. The hedgehogs are easily recognised by their spines while gymnures look more like large rats.

Family: Erinaceidae (hedgehogs)
Subfamily: Erinaceinae
Genus: Hemiechinus
 Desert hedgehog, H. aethiopicus

Order: Soricomorpha (shrews, moles, and solenodons) 

The "shrew-forms" are insectivorous mammals. The shrews and solenodons closely resemble mice while the moles are stout-bodied burrowers.

Family: Soricidae (shrews)
Subfamily: Crocidurinae
Genus: Crocidura
 Mauritanian shrew, C. lusitania LC
 Saharan shrew, Crocidura tarfayensis DD
 Whitaker's shrew, Crocidura whitakeri LC

Order: Chiroptera (bats) 

The bats' most distinguishing feature is that their forelimbs are developed as wings, making them the only mammals capable of flight. Bat species account for about 20% of all mammals.

Family: Rhinopomatidae
Genus: Rhinopoma

Family: Rhinopomatidae
Genus: Rhinopoma
 Egyptian mouse-tailed bat, R. cystops 
 Lesser mouse-tailed bat, Rhinopoma hardwickei LC
 Greater mouse-tailed bat, Rhinopoma microphyllum LC

Order: Cetacea (whales) 

The order Cetacea includes whales, dolphins and porpoises. They are the mammals most fully adapted to aquatic life with a spindle-shaped nearly hairless body, protected by a thick layer of blubber, and forelimbs and tail modified to provide propulsion underwater.

Suborder: Mysticeti
Family: Balaenidae (right whales)
Genus: Eubalaena
 North Atlantic right whale, Eubalaena glacialis CR (Seen historically)
Family: Balaenopteridae (rorquals)
Genus: Balaenoptera
 Northern minke whale, Balaenoptera acutorostrata LC
 Sei whale, Balaenoptera borealis EN
 Bryde's whale, Balaenoptera edeni DD
 Blue whale, Balaenoptera musculus EN
 Fin whale, Balaenoptera physalus EN
Genus: Megaptera
 Humpback whale, Megaptera novaengliae LC
Suborder: Odontoceti
Family: Delphinidae (pilot whales and dolphins)
Genus: Delphinus
 Short-beaked common dolphin, Delphinus delphis LC
Genus: Globicephala
 Short-finned pilot whale, Globicephala macrorhynchus DD
 Long-finned pilot whale, Globicephala melas DD
Genus: Grampus
 Risso's dolphin, Grampus griseus LC
Genus: Lagenodelphis
 Fraser's dolphin, Lagenodelphis hosei LC
Genus: Orcinus
 Orca, O. orca DD
Genus: Pseudorca
 False killer whale, Pseudorca crassidens DD
Genus: Feresa
 Pygmy killer whale, Feresa attenuata DD
Genus: Stenella
 Striped dolphin, Stenella coeruleoalba LC
 Atlantic spotted dolphin, Stenella frontalis DD
Genus: Steno
 Rough-toothed dolphin, Steno bredanensis LC
Genus: Tursiops
 Common bottlenose dolphin, Tursiops truncatus LC
Family: Kogiidae (small sperm whales)
Genus: Kogia
 Pygmy sperm whale, K. breviceps DD
 Dwarf sperm whale, Kogia sima DD
Family: Phocoenidae (porpoises)
Genus: Phocoena
 Harbour porpoise, Phocoena phocoena LC
Family: Physeteridae (sperm whales)
Genus: Physeter
 Sperm whale, Physeter macrocephalus VU
Family: Ziphiidae (beaked whales)
Genus: Peponocephala
 Melon-headed whale, Peponocephala electra DD
Genus: Hyperoodon
 Northern bottlenose whale, Hyperoodon ampullatus LC
Genus: Mesoplodon
 Sowerby's beaked whale, Mesoplodon bidens VU
 Blainville's beaked whale, Mesoplodon densirostris DD
 Gervais' beaked whale, Mesoplodon europaeus DD
 True's beaked whale, Mesoplodon mirus DD
Genus: Ziphius
 Cuvier's beaked whale, Ziphius cavirostris DD

Order: Carnivora (carnivorans) 

There are over 260 species of carnivorans, the majority of which feed primarily on meat. They have a characteristic skull shape and dentition.
Suborder: Feliformia
Family: Felidae (cats)
Subfamily: Felinae
Genus: Felis
 African wildcat, F. lybica 
 Sand cat, F. margarita 
Subfamily: Pantherinae
Genus: Panthera
 Lion, P. leo  extirpated
Family: Hyaenidae (hyaenas)
Genus: Hyaena
Striped hyena, H. hyaena 
Suborder: Caniformia
Family: Canidae (dogs, foxes)
Genus: Canis
African golden wolf, C. lupaster 
Genus: Vulpes
Pale fox, Vulpes pallida LC
Family: Mustelidae (mustelids)
Genus: Ictonyx
Saharan striped polecat, Ictonyx libyca 
Genus: Mellivora
 Honey badger, M. capensis 
Suborder: Pinnipedia
Family: Phocidae(earless seals)
Genus: Monachus
 Mediterranean monk seal, M. monachus

Order: Artiodactyla (even-toed ungulates) 

The even-toed ungulates are ungulates whose weight is borne about equally by the third and fourth toes, rather than mostly or entirely by the third as in perissodactyls. There are about 220 artiodactyl species, including many that are of great economic importance to humans.

Family: Bovidae (cattle, antelope, sheep, goats)
Subfamily: Antilopinae
Genus: Gazella
 Cuvier's gazelle, G. cuvieri 
 Dorcas gazelle, G. dorcas 
Genus: Nanger
 Dama gazelle, N. dama  extirpated
Subfamily: Caprinae
Genus: Ammotragus
 Barbary sheep, A. lervia 
Subfamily: Hippotraginae
Genus: Addax
 Addax, A. nasomaculatus  extirpated
Genus: Oryx
 Scimitar oryx, O. dammah  extirpated

References

External links

See also
List of chordate orders
Lists of mammals by region
List of prehistoric mammals
Mammal classification
List of mammals described in the 2000s

Western Sahara
Western Sahara
mammals
Mammals of North Africa